Fulgoraria hitoshiikedai  is a species of sea snail, a marine gastropod mollusc in the family Volutidae, the volutes.

It was first described by Nguyên Ngoc Thach in 2018 from a specimen collected in the coastal waters off Vietnam.

References 

 

hitoshiikedai
Gastropods described in 2018